Ecology is a scientific journal that publishes research and synthesizes papers in the field of ecology.  It was founded in 1920 as the continuation of Plant World, and is published by the Ecological Society of America. According to the Journal Citation Reports, it is currently ranked 15th out of 136 journals in the Ecology category.

References

External links 
 

Ecology journals
English-language journals
Publications established in 1920